Mangalampadu is a village in Nellore district of the Indian state of Andhra Pradesh. It is located in Sullurpeta mandal.

Transport

Road
Sullurpet is the nearest town to Mangalampadu, 13 km away. Sullurpet straddles NH 16 connecting Chennai and Kolkata. When coming from Sullurpet, taking a right turn at Elupuru Cross leads to Mangalampadu and this route rejoins the Kalahasti Road bypassing BN Kandriga.

Rail
The nearest railway station is Sullurpet, which is connected to Chennai Central by suburban trains running daily.

Bus
There is a bus stop at Mangalampadu serviced by multiple bus routes. Sullurpet also has a bus stop serviced by KSRTC and APSRTC buses, with direct bus connectivity to Bangalore, Chennai, Tirupati and other cities and towns nearby.

References

Villages in Nellore district